The Dutch Tweede Divisie in the 1958–59 season was contested by 29 teams, fifteen of which playing in group A, fourteen in group B. Teams occupying the lowest two places from each group at the end of the season, would have to play in a relegation play-off (however, two teams chose to relegate to amateur football immediately). That play-off would not be played this season, but in the next. The worst placed teams from that year would also enter. In the play-off (played after the 1959–60 season), teams would play against relegation to amateur football. The changes were part of an attempt by the KNVB to eventually make the Tweede Divisie one league instead of two.

New entrants
Relegated from the Eerste Divisie
HFC EDO (entered in the A-group)
Xerxes (entered in the A-group)
Entered from amateur football
Velox (entered in the A-group)

Final tables

Tweede Divisie A

Tweede Divisie B

See also
 1958–59 Eredivisie
 1958–59 Eerste Divisie

References
Netherlands - List of final tables (RSSSF)

Tweede Divisie seasons
3
Neth